Novotroitske is an urban-type settlement in Henichesk Raion, Kherson Oblast, southern Ukraine. It hosts the administration of the Novotroitske settlement hromada, one of the hromadas of Ukraine. It had a population of

Administrative status 
Until 18 July, 2020, Novotroitske was the administrative center of Novotroitske Raion. The raion was abolished in July 2020 as part of the administrative reform of Ukraine, which reduced the number of raions of Kherson Oblast to five. The area of Novotroitske Raion was merged into Henichesk Raion.

See also 

 Russian occupation of Kherson Oblast

References

External links
 Novotroitske at the Verkhovna Rada of Ukraine site

Urban-type settlements in Henichesk Raion
1816 in Ukraine